Aya Sakagami (born 8 June 1997) is a Japanese judoka.

She is the bronze medallist of the 2018 Judo Grand Prix The Hague in the -48 kg category.

References

External links
 

1997 births
Living people
Japanese female judoka
21st-century Japanese women